Queen of Reversals is a 2010 South Korean television series, starring Kim Nam-joo, Jung Joon-ho, Park Si-hoo and Chae Jung-an. It is about a career woman who experiences the many ups, downs, and reversals of work, family, and romance as she falls in and out of love and marriage. It aired on MBC from October 18, 2010 to February 1, 2011 on Mondays and Tuesdays at 21:55 for 31 episodes.

Lead actress Kim Nam-joo and writer Park Ji-eun previously worked together on the 2009 series Queen of Housewives.

Plot
Hwang Tae-hee (Kim Nam-joo) leads a charmed life; after growing up in a wealthy family, she easily attains a coveted job. Ever the strong and decisive career woman, she is successful and beautiful, but lacks one important thing in her life: a man. Too much of a workaholic to make time for romance, she is taken aback when she falls hard for Bong Joon-soo (Jung Joon-ho). She loses no time in pursuing him and they soon get married, but when the honeymoon is over, Tae-hee finds that her rival at work and husband's ex, Baek Yeo-jin (Chae Jung-an), has taken over her job. Things aren't easy for Tae-hee as she juggles taking care of a daughter at home and leading a team at the same company as her husband and Yeo-jin. Misunderstandings grow over time between Tae-hee and Joon-soo, putting their marriage into jeopardy.

Meanwhile, Tae-hee's arrogant, immature chaebol boss Goo Yong-shik (Park Si-hoo), previously apathetic, grows more serious about his work with her guidance – and ends up falling hopelessly in love with her.

Cast
Kim Nam-joo as Hwang Tae-hee 
Jung Joon-ho as Bong Joon-soo 
Park Si-hoo as Goo Yong-shik
Chae Jung-an as Baek Yeo-jin 
Ha Yoo-mi as Han Song-yi 
Choi Jung-woo as Goo Ho-seung 
Kim Hye-jung as Jang Sook-jung
Kim Chang-wan as General Manager Mok Young-chul 
Kim Yong-hee as Section Chief Oh Dae-soo 
Im Ji-kyu as Kang-woo 
Yu Ji-in as Oh Mi-soon 
Park Jung-soo as Na Young-ja 
Kim Yong-gun as Tae-hee's father 
Shin Soo-yeon as So-ra, Tae-hee & Joon-soo's daughter
Yoo Hye-ri as Yong-shik's biological mother 
Han Yeo-woon as Hwang Yeon-hee 
Kim Se-min as Yeon-hee's husband
Han Kyu-hee as Joon-soo's father 
Lee Joo-na as Bong Mi-geum 
Lee Sun-young as Bong Soon-geum 
Oh Na-ra as Bong Hae-kum
Ahn Sang-tae as Kang Dong-won 
Kang Rae-yeon as So Yoo-kyung 
Ga Deuk-hee as Bu Min-ah 
Choi Yoon-young as Ki-ppeum 
Oh Soo-min as Hyun-joo 
Ryu Je-hee as Han Song-yi's secretary 
Son Gun-woo as Team Leader Chu Sang-chul 
Yoo Tae-woong as Goo Yong-chul 
Jung Soo-young as Ji Hwa-ja (cameo, ep 5) 
Kim Seung-woo as security guard (cameo, ep 7) 
Lee Bong-won as (cameo)

Ratings
In the table below,  represent the lowest ratings and  represent the highest ratings.

Source: TNS Media Korea

International broadcast
 It aired in Japan on Fuji TV at the same time as another of Park Si-hoo's dramas, Prosecutor Princess.
 It aired in Panama on Sertv as "La Reina de los Reveses".
 It aired in Vietnam on VTV6 as "Nữ hoàng rắc rối", beginning from September 24, 2012.

References

External links
 Queen of Reversals official MBC website 
 Queen of Reversals at MBC Global Media
 

Korean-language television shows
2010 South Korean television series debuts
2011 South Korean television series endings
MBC TV television dramas
South Korean romantic comedy television series
Television shows written by Park Ji-eun